Nazri Nasir (born 17 January 1971) is a Singaporean professional football manager and former footballer. He was the captain of the Singapore national team from 1997 to 2003, and led the team to the 1998 AFF Championship title.

He was a defensive midfielder known for his "combative, hard-running and ferocious tackling style".

Club career 

Nazri began his career with Jurong Town in Singapore's FAS Premier League in 1988. where he won the President's Cup in 1988 and 1989. Along with Rafi Ali and Sanizal Jamil, he was sent for a two-month training stint with Czech club FC Nitra under the Goh Chok Tong Talent Scheme in 1990. He rejected an offer of a professional contract from FC Nitra and signed for Balestier United in 1991 on a two-year deal worth S$10,000 per year.

In February 1994, Nazri signed a two-year contract with the Singapore Lions which went on to achieve the Malaysian League and Malaysia Cup double that year. Following the withdrawal of the team from Malaysian competitions and the upcoming Southeast Asian Games, the FAS decided to enter the Lions in the 1995 Premier League pending the formation of Singapore's S.League. The team went the season unbeaten as they finished winners.

Nazri played for Sembawang Rangers in the inaugural S.League season before signing for Singapore Armed Forces the following year. He won the S.League in 1997, 1998 and 2000 with the club. In 2002, he signed for Tampines Rovers where he played as a central defender, winning the league in 2004 and 2005.

Nazri retired as a player at the age of 37 in 2008.

International career 

Nazri made his international debut against Malaysia on 13 September 1990. He was riding his motorbike when he was injured in a road traffic accident on the expressway on 19 November 1992; his backbone and right collarbone were fractured. He began retraining five weeks later but did not recover sufficiently to play in the Merdeka Tournament in February 1993.

Nazri took over the captaincy in 1997 and skippered Singapore to the 1998 ASEAN Football Championship title. He was inducted into the FIFA Century Club in June 2007.

Coaching career 

After retiring as a player, Nazri was appointed as the general manager at former club Tampines Rovers. He was the coach of the National Football Academy U-15 teams that participated in the 2012 and 2013 Lion City Cup.

On 16 December 2013, he was confirmed as assistant to the LionsXII head coach and former Singapore Lions teammate Fandi Ahmad.

Nazri was appointed to interim head coach position of Singapore national team for the 2019 Airmarine Cup friendly tournament in March 2019. With the team, he won the semifinal match against Malaysia 1-0 before losing in the final to Oman 4–5 on penalties, having tied 1–1 in normal time.

Personal life 

Nazri was born to father, Nasir Ahmad (d. December 1993, aged 69) and mother, Aisha Abdullah. He credits his mother for supporting his football career despite him having asthma at eight years old and poor grades in his studies. He has six brothers and four sisters. His older brother, Amin, is a former Singapore international defender and current Hougang United coach.

He completed his primary education at Sembawang Primary School and secondary education at Si Ling Secondary School. He graduated with a NTC 2 certificate in architectural draughting from McNair Vocational Institute.

Nazri married air stewardess Sharifah Nur Leila on 27 November 1994. His sons, Adam and Amer Hakeem, play under the National Football Academy set-up as centre-backs.

Honours

Club 
Jurong Town
President's Cup: 1988, 1989

Singapore Lions
M.League: 1994
Malaysia Cup: 1994

Singapore Armed Forces
S.League: 1997, 1998, 2000
Singapore Cup: 1997, 1999

Tampines Rovers
S.League: 2004, 2005
Singapore Cup: 2002, 2004, 2006

International 
Singapore
ASEAN Football Championship: 1998

Individual 
S.League People's Choice Award: 2004

See also
 List of men's footballers with 100 or more international caps

References

External links 

Singaporean footballers
Singapore international footballers
Singapore FA players
Tampines Rovers FC players
FIFA Century Club
1971 births
Living people
Jurong FC players
Balestier Khalsa FC players
Home United FC players
Sembawang Rangers FC players
Warriors FC players
Singapore Premier League players
Singaporean people of Malay descent
Association football midfielders
Footballers at the 1990 Asian Games
Southeast Asian Games bronze medalists for Singapore
Southeast Asian Games medalists in football
Competitors at the 1991 Southeast Asian Games
Asian Games competitors for Singapore
Si Ling Secondary School alumni
Singapore national football team managers